Said Ettaqy (born 16 September 1996) is an Italian male long-distance runner and cross-country runner who won four medals ath the European Cross Country Championships at youth level.

Achievements

See also
 Italy at the European Cross Country Championships

References

External links

1996 births
Living people
Italian male long-distance runners
Italian male cross country runners
Athletics competitors of Gruppo Sportivo Esercito